Type C1 submarine may refer to:

 I-16-class submarine, also called Type C1 submarine or Type C submarine (Junsen Hei-gata), the 1st class submarine of the Imperial Japanese Navy
 , also called Type C1 submarine (C1-gata), the 3rd class submarine of the Imperial Japanese Navy

See also
 C-class submarine (disambiguation)